Kirti Nagar railway station is a small railway station in Kirti Nagar which is a residential and commercial neighborhood of the West Delhi district of Delhi. Its code is KRTN. The station is part of Delhi Suburban Railway. The station consist of 4 platforms.

See also
 Hazrat Nizamuddin railway station
 New Delhi Railway Station
 Delhi Junction Railway station
 Anand Vihar Railway Terminal
 Sarai Rohilla Railway Station
 Delhi Metro

References

External links

Railway stations in West Delhi district
Delhi railway division